Elections to Sedgefield Borough Council were held on 3 May 2007.  The whole council was up for election and the Labour Party stayed in overall control of the council.

A notable result was in New Trimdon and Trimdon Grange ward where the Conservative Party candidate Shirley Bowes obtained no votes.

This was the last Segdefield borough election to be held during the premiership of the borough's then MP, Tony Blair, who resigned as Prime Minister and as the Member for Sedgefield the following month.

Election result

|}

Ward results

References

External links
 2007 Sedgefield election result

2007 English local elections
2007
2000s in County Durham